The Scalan was once a seminary and was one of the few places in Scotland where the Roman Catholic faith was kept alive during the troubled times of the 18th century.

History
For much of the 18th century, the college at Scalan in the Braes of Glenlivet was the only place in Scotland where young men were trained to be priests, the so-called "heather priests". From 1717 to 1799, over a hundred were trained despite numerous attacks by Hanoverian soldiers.

The college played a vital role in keeping the traditional Catholic faith alive in northern Scotland. It was named after the Gaelic word for turf sheilings ("galan") found in the Braes during that period. In 1799, the college was moved to a less remote site, Aquhorthies College, which had larger premises and more accommodation.

Alexander Geddes, Scottish theologian and scholar, was among the famous figures who studied at the college. George James Gordon, known as the "heather priest" was educated here and then taught here as a non-Jesuit for many years.

The last permanent resident of the Scalan was Sandy Mattheson, who died in late 2005.

Today
Visitors today will note that the college is largely invisible until you are very close to the college, a factor invaluable in evading detection by the Hanoverian soldiers.

The Scalan is now a museum and is open all year for visitors.

The Scalan Association seeks to promote the preservation of the college of Scalan and its history.

Gallery

References

External links 

 The Glenlivet Estate's official page about the Scalan
 The Scalan Association

1717 establishments in Scotland
Religious museums in Scotland
Historic house museums in Moray
Category A listed buildings in Moray
Catholic seminaries in Scotland
18th-century Catholicism
Former theological colleges in Scotland
1717 in Christianity
Underground education